Thomas, Tommy or Tom Sands may refer to:

Thomas Sands (fencer) (1907–1984), American Olympic fencer
Tommy Sands (American singer) (born 1937), American singer and actor
Tommy Sands (Irish singer) (born 1945), Irish folk singer
Tom Sands (born 1954), Iowa State Representative from the 87th District
Thomas Sands (MP), Member of Parliament for Cumberland, 1390 and 1395

See also
 Sands (surname)
 Thomas Sandys (disambiguation)